The Scottish Council for Voluntary Organisations (SCVO) is the national membership body for Scotland’s charities, voluntary organisations and social enterprises. SCVO works to support people to take voluntary action to help themselves and others, and to bring about social change. It provides services and support to the third sector in Scotland to advance shared values and interests. SCVO has approximately 2,800 members, ranging from individuals and grassroots groups, to Scotland-wide organisations and intermediary bodies. The organisation employs approximately 100 staff.

Aims
SCVO’s aims are to:

 support third sector organisations to do their work
 promote and support shared interests of third sector organisations
 connect people with ways to get involved with their communities
 as an organisation continually learn, develop and enhance its own effectiveness.

Governance
SCVO is governed by a Management Board with representatives elected from its Policy Committee. Anna Fowlie has been Chief Executive since 23 April 2018, taking over from Martin Sime who held the role from 1991 to late 2017. Andrew Burns is the current convener.

History
The organisation was established on 1 October 1943 as the Scottish Council of Social Service (SCSS). During its first years much of the Council’s work was dictated by wartime need and its immediate aftermath. 
 
In 1983 the Council’s name was changed to the Scottish Council for Community and Voluntary Organisations with the working title of Voluntary Action for Scotland. In 1986 the name Scottish Council for Voluntary Organisations was adopted.

SCVO hosted the 6th, 7th and 8th CIVICUS World Assemblies in 2006, 2007 and 2008.

Current work
SCVO supports the third sector in Scotland in a variety of ways, including
 Lobbying and campaigning on behalf of the sector
 Running training, conferences and events
 Providing services and deals to members
 Managing jobs and employability initiatives

SCVO Credit Union
SCVO Credit Union Limited is a savings and loans co-operative established in 1998 for employees and open to anybody who is a trustee, employee or voluntary worker for any charitable organisation which is a registered member. It is a member of the Association of British Credit Unions Limited, authorised by the Prudential Regulation Authority and regulated by the Financial Conduct Authority and the PRA. Ultimately, like the banks and building societies, members’ savings are protected against business failure by the Financial Services Compensation Scheme.

Sister organisations
National Council for Voluntary Organisations (England)
Wales Council for Voluntary Action (Wales)
Northern Ireland Council for Voluntary Action (Northern Ireland)
The Wheel (Ireland)

References

External links
 

Non-profit organisations based in Scotland
Credit unions of the United Kingdom
Volunteer organisations in the United Kingdom